Gono may refer to:

People
 Akihiro Gono (born 1974), Japanese mixed martial artist
 Gideon Gono (born 1959), Governor of the Reserve Bank of Zimbabwe
 Matt Gono (born 1996), American American football player
 Miroslav Gono (born 2000), Slovak football player

Other
 Gono University
 Gonō Line, Japan
 Gōnō